Büşra Yalçınkaya (born 1 January 1996) is a Turkish badminton player.

Achievements

BWF International Challenge/Series (1 title, 1 runner-up) 
Women's singles

Women's doubles

  BWF International Challenge tournament
  BWF International Series tournament
  BWF Future Series tournament

References

External links 
 

1996 births
Living people
Turkish female badminton players